Abhai the general (or Abhai Mihrsabor) is a Christian saint and a martyr.

He was killed by his father Aduzphiruzgerd. His mother is Astina. His relics are located at Killith monastery in Mesopotamia, where he had served as abbot. His feast day is October 1 in the Syrian Church.

References

Sources
 Holweck, F. G. A Biographical Dictionary of the Saints. St. Louis, MO: B. Herder Book Co., 1924.

Year of birth missing
Year of death missing
Christian saints in unknown century
Christian martyrs
Syriac Orthodox Church saints